Vanderbeck House may refer to:

Vanderbeck House (Mahwah, New Jersey), Bergen County
Vanderbeck House (Ridgewood, New Jersey), Bergen County
Vanderbeck House (Rochester, New York)

See also
Tallman–Vanderbeck House, Closter, New Jersey, in Bergen County
Jacob Vanderbeck Jr. House, Fair Lawn, New Jersey, in Bergen County